For the grammarian, see William Lennie.

Willie Lennie (26 January 1882 – 23 August 1954) was a Scottish professional footballer who played for Queen's Park, Rangers, Dundee, Fulham and Aberdeen.

Lennie joined Aberdeen from Fulham in 1905 and spent eight years with the club, becoming the first Aberdeen player to play for Scotland in 1908.

References

External links

1882 births
Footballers from Glasgow
Association football wingers
Scottish footballers
Scotland international footballers
Queen's Park F.C. players
Rangers F.C. players
Dundee F.C. players
Fulham F.C. players
Aberdeen F.C. players
Scottish Football League players
English Football League players
Falkirk F.C. players
St Johnstone F.C. players
Scottish Football League representative players
Maryhill F.C. players
Scottish Junior Football Association players
Scotland junior international footballers
1954 deaths